The Kakwa language (also called Kakuwâ) is a Nilotic language spoken by the Kakwa people in Uganda, the Democratic Republic of the Congo, and South Sudan.

References

Eastern Nilotic languages
Languages of South Sudan
Languages of Uganda